Murray J. Harris (born 19 March 1939) is professor emeritus of New Testament exegesis and theology at Trinity Evangelical Divinity School in Deerfield, Illinois. He was for a time warden of Tyndale House at Cambridge University. He gained his PhD from the University of Manchester, studying under F. F. Bruce.

He has written the book Slave of Christ in the IVP series New Studies in Biblical Theology which has been well received. Aside from this Harris is probably best known for his commentaries on 2 Corinthians in both the Expositor's Bible Commenatary (both editions) and the New International Greek Testament Commentary series.

Selected works

Books

Articles and chapters

References

1939 births
Living people
Bible commentators
New Zealand biblical scholars
Trinity International University faculty
Alumni of the University of Manchester